Jazz at the College of the Pacific is a live album by Dave Brubeck Quartet. It was recorded and released in December 1953 on Fantasy Records as F 3223. The cover was designed by Ed Colker and drawn by Arnold Roth. Critic Nat Hentoff wrote in Down Beat magazine that the album "ranks with the Oberlin and Storyville sets as the best of Brubeck on record".

Fantasy released seven additional performances from this concert in 2002 on the album Jazz at the College of the Pacific, Vol. 2.

Track listing
"All the Things You Are" (Jerome Kern, Oscar Hammerstein II) 9:12
"Laura" (David Raksin, Johnny Mercer) 3:12
"Lullaby in Rhythm" (Walter Hirsch, Benny Goodman) 7:25
"I'll Never Smile Again" (Ruth Lowe) 5:28
"I Remember You" (Victor Schertzinger, Johnny Mercer) 9:12
"For All We Know" (J. Fred Coots, Sam M. Lewis) 5:52

Personnel
Dave Brubeck - piano
Paul Desmond - alto saxophone
Ron Crotty - bass
Joe Dodge - drums

References

Dave Brubeck albums
1954 live albums
Fantasy Records live albums
Culture of Sacramento, California
University of the Pacific (United States)
Jazz musicians from California
1953 in California